The International Tournée of Animation was an annual touring program of animated films that started in 1965 as The First Festival of Animated Film with each selected and assembled from films from many countries around the world and which existed from the 1970s to the 1980s-90s.

Typical program content
As released to cinemas, college campuses, and art museums and centers across the United States, a typical Tournée program ran about 105 minutes and consisted of 15 to 24 animated films in the 16mm format, each running from 1 or 2 minutes to 15 or 18 minutes each in length.

An example of the typical range of countries represented comes from the 14th Tournée in 1980 which contained 18 award-winning films from Canada, France, United Kingdom, The Netherlands, Hungary, United States and Yugoslavia. Altogether over twenty annual programs were prepared and presented; the 17th International Tournée of Animation was devoted entirely to the films of the National Film Board of Canada.

History
About 1966, several members of ASIFA-Hollywood (The Los Angeles branch of ASIFA, the International Animated Film Association) decided to put together an international animation program to be shown at the Los Angeles County Museum of Art. It was almost impossible to see quality animation in the US at that time. Prescott Wright became active with the group when he joined the American Film Institute in 1969 and, having worked previously in film distribution, he was asked to head the project when it was decided to show the program in other cities.

Under Wright's guidance, the program became known as the "International Tournée of Animation" and, by late 1970, he began to book the program at the San Francisco Museum of Modern Art, university campuses, and other cultural institutions around the US.

The animators were offered a generous contract as part of their agreement to enter their films in the Tournée. As producers, Wright and his associates received 50% of the gross, while the remaining 50% was split among the artists. About half of the money going to the animators was split evenly between each filmmaker and the remaining amount was split based on the length of each short film. This meant that a very short film got slightly less than the one which was a minute or two longer.

Increased visibility through theatrical screenings
In the mid-1970s, the Tournée increased its visibility by being screened in cinemas, initially thanks to a sale with the Landmark Theatres chain, but gradually seen in many smaller "art houses" across the country. In 1986 Prescott Wright sold the rights to the Tournées to the Expanded Entertainment group (which was under the leadership of Terry Thoren and the expertise of animation historian Jerry Beck) in Los Angeles which continued to organize them for several years with Wright's guidance.

Coverage of the festival ranged from praises by film critics, including Leonard Maltin for Entertainment Tonight, to guest appearances on talk shows such as The Today Show.

Notable films that played at Tournée
Why Me?
Second Class Mail
All My Relations
Face Like a Frog
Seryi Volk & Krasnaya Shapochka and other works by Garri Bardin
A Christmas Carol and other works by Richard Williams
Jumping
The Fly
Kick Me
Arabesque
Harpya
Mr. Pascal and other works by Alison De Vere
The Wizard of Speed and Time
Dream Doll
Technological Threat
The Man Who Planted Trees
Skywhales
Ubu
The Sandman
Ode to G.I. Joe 
Balance 
The Killing of an Egg and other works by Paul Driessen
Juke-Bar
Girls Night Out
Luxo Jr.
Your Face and other works by Bill Plympton
A Greek Tragedy
The Big Snit
Anna & Bella
Charade
The Great Cognito and other works by Will Vinton
The Cow
Tin Toy 
Vincent
Arnold Escapes from Church
Reci, Reci, Reci
Red's Dream
The Cat Came Back 
Creature Comforts
Bottom's Dream
Anijam
Frog Baseball
Big House Blues 
Red Ball Express
Special Delivery
History of the World in Three Minutes Flat
Satiemania
Sigmund and other works by Bruno Bozzetto
78 Tours and other works by Georges Schwizgebel

Notable films shown at Animation Celebration
Broken Down Film
The Simpsons shorts from The Tracy Ullman Show
Quasi's Cabaret Trailer
Tuber's Two-Step
Propagandance
Knick Knack
Darkness/Light/Darkness
Get a Job
It's An O.K. Life
The Adventures of Andre and Wally B
Nausicaä of the Valley of the Wind (under the title Warriors of the Wind)
Strings
Blackfly
Son of the White Mare
Starchaser: The Legend of Orin
Castle in the Sky

Frequent animation studios
Buzzco Associates
Pixar Animation Studios 
National Film Board of Canada
Aardman Animations
Zagreb Film
Sources:

See also
Anime
Spike and Mike's Festival of Animation
Animation Show of Shows
The Animation Show
Independent animation
Fantastic Animation Festival
Academy Award for Best Animated Short Film
Arthouse animation
Cult film

External links 
 
 
  Annecy Animation Festival website
 The 9th International Tournée of Animation Intro (1974) on Vimeo
 Promotional clips

References

Film festivals held in multiple countries
Animation film festivals
Defunct film festivals in the United States
Animation compilation
1960s in animation
1970s in animation
1980s in animation
1990s in animation
Animation film festivals in the United States